Patriarch Cosmas of Alexandria may refer to:

 Patriarch Cosmas I of Alexandria, Greek Patriarch of Alexandria in 727–768
 Patriarch Cosmas II of Alexandria, Greek Patriarch of Alexandria in 1723–1736
 Patriarch Cosmas III of Alexandria, Greek Patriarch of Alexandria in 1737–1746